The 1991–92 Hong Kong First Division League season was the 81st since its establishment.

League table

References
1991–92 Hong Kong First Division table (RSSSF)

Hong Kong First Division League seasons
First Division